Ogo Bodhu Sundori was an Indian soap opera, directed by Rakesh Kumar, created and produced by Ravi Ojha, under his banner Ravi Ojha Productions. The series starred Ritabhari Chakraborty and Rajdeep Gupta in lead roles, while Tulika Basu, Haradhan Bannerjee, Shankar Chakraborty and Bidipta Chakraborty in other pivotal roles. Apparently, Rajdeep Gupta opted out due to health issues and Rehaan Roy was cast instead of him.

The story and dialogues have been penned by Mitali Bhattacharya along with Zama Habib and Sharmila Mukherjee respectively. The show premiered on Star Jalsha on television from 3 August 2009. The show ended on 5 December 2010. Later it was mistaken to be remade in Hindi as Sasural Genda Phool, while later, the makers confirmed that Sasural Genda Phool was an original series, and the Bengali and Hindi versions were written at the same time by the same makers and production house making both original shows. It was re-aired on Star Jalsha during lockdown period, due to the COVID-19 pandemic.

Cast
Ritabhari Chakraborty as Lolita Chatterjee (née Lahiri)
Rajdeep Gupta/Rehaan Roy as Ishaan Lahiri
Tulika Basu as Shailaja Lahiri
Haradhan Banerjee as Hrishikesh Lahiri
Mita Chatterjee as Hrishikesh's wife, Ishan's paternal grandmother
Shankar Chakraborty as Ishan's father
Bidipta Chakraborty as Ishan's mother
Sohini Sarkar as Dolon Maitra
Dwaipayan Das as Imon
Rajanya Mitra as Rojoni 
Maitreyee Mitra as Radha
Roosha Chatterjee as Labanya
Sutirtha Saha as Kamal
Ronnie Chakraborty as Indra
Subha Roy Chowdhury as Raj Mukerjee
Goutam Dey as Jayanta Chatterjee-Lolita and Labanya's Father
Suchishmita Chowdhury as Late Jayeeta Chatterjee- Lalita and Labanya's late mother

References

External links
 

2009 Indian television series debuts
2010 Indian television series endings
Bengali-language television programming in India
Indian drama television series
Star Jalsha original programming